Slavko Lukić (Serbian Cyrillic: Cлaвкo Лукић; born 14 March 1989) is a Serbian footballer who plays as a right back.

Club career
Lukić was a member of Red Star Belgrade's youth selections as well as the youth teams of Serbia and Montenegro before the split up in 2006. He made his senior debut with FK Morava Velika Plana, before moving to Smederevo. Smederevo sent him on a loan spell to Limhamn Bunkeflo, before he would be transferred to Novi Pazar in 2012.

On 26 March 2013 Lukić got into the center of the conversation about Smederevo's controversial 1–2 loss to Red Star Belgrade; he had tackled Red Star Belgrade's Cadú in the penalty box, and the referee subsequently awarded Red Star a penalty, bringing about allegations that the referee effectively aided Red Star's victory.

On 26 June 2013 it was reported that Lukić was almost killed in a road rage incident when an unidentified Peugeot tried to push Lukić's car off the highway; the occupants of the unidentified car managed to trap Lukić's car and proceeded to beat him with a metal pole on the stomach.

On 26 June 2014 it was announced that Lukić signed for FK Sutjeska Nikšić, who had won the Montenegrin First League at the end of the 2014 season. On 24 August 2015, Lukić left Sutjeska Nikšić to join Albanian Superliga club Teuta Durrës.

References

External links
 
 Slavko Lukić Stats at Utakmica.rs 
 

Living people
1989 births
Serbian footballers
Association football defenders
Serbian expatriate footballers
Expatriate footballers in Sweden
Expatriate footballers in Albania
Expatriate footballers in Slovakia
Expatriate footballers in Uzbekistan
Expatriate footballers in Montenegro
Serbian expatriate sportspeople in Sweden
Serbian expatriate sportspeople in Albania
Serbian expatriate sportspeople in Slovakia
Serbian expatriate sportspeople in Uzbekistan
Serbian expatriate sportspeople in Montenegro
Serbian SuperLiga players
Navbahor Namangan players
Ettan Fotboll players
Kategoria Superiore players
Uzbekistan Super League players
FK Smederevo players
IF Limhamn Bunkeflo (men) players
FK Novi Pazar players
FK Sutjeska Nikšić players
KF Teuta Durrës players
Flamurtari Vlorë players
FC Spartak Trnava players
Slovak Super Liga players
FC Nasaf players
FK Zemun players